Gennadas is a genus of shrimps in the family Benthesicymidae.

Some species may occur at higher latitudes. For instance, collections of Gennadas kempi have been made as far south as 61° south in the Antarctic Ocean.

References 

 Vertical distribution and feeding of the shrimp genera Gennadas and Bentheogennema (Decapoda: Penaeidea) in the eastern Gulf of Mexico. JJ Heffernan, TL Hopkins, Journal of Crustacean Biology, 1981
 Sur les Gennadas ou Pénéides bathypélagiques. EL Bouvier, Bulletin du Musée Océanographique de Monaco, 1906
 The eyes of mesopelagic crustaceans: I. Gennadas sp.(Penaeidae). VB Meyer-Rochow, S Walsh, Cell and Tissue Research, 1977
 Hendrickx, M.E. 2015: Further records of species of Gennadas (Crustacea, Decapoda, Dendrobranchiata, Benthesicymidae) in the Mexican Pacific. Zootaxa 3980(3), pages 417–426,

External links 

 Gennadas at WoRMS

Dendrobranchiata
Decapod genera